Rodrigo Vargas Touchard (born 1 September 1989) is a Bolivian professional footballer who plays as a midfielder for Liga de Fútbol Profesional Boliviano club Club San José.

Career statistics

Club

References

1989 births
Living people
Bolivian footballers
Association football midfielders
Club Bolívar players
Club Aurora players
Nacional Potosí players
C.D. Jorge Wilstermann players
The Strongest players
Club San José players